Karin Rehbein (born 30 March 1949 in Aurich) is a German dressage rider. Riding the stallion Donnerhall, Rehbein won multiple championships medal during the 1990s.

References

External links
 

Living people
1949 births
German female equestrians
German dressage riders
People from Aurich
Sportspeople from Lower Saxony